Mill Woods Town Centre is best known for its shopping mall and is the commercial centre of the Mill Woods area of Edmonton, Alberta, Canada. What is less well known is that the mall is part of a larger neighbourhood with the same name.  The larger neighbourhood is home to a sizable residential population of 1074 according to the 2005 municipal census.

Mill Woods Town Centre is bounded on the north by 28 Avenue, on the south by 23 Avenue, on the west by 66 Street, and on the east by 50 Street.  Hewes Way, a major thoroughfare, cuts the neighbourhood roughly in half.

Demographics 

Residential development 
 The neighbourhood's residential population lives in a mixture of rented apartments (38%) and apartment style condominiums (62%).  According to the 2001 federal census, all residential construction in the neighbourhood was built during the 1990s.

The average household size is 1.7 persons. While there are a 55 three person households (8% of all households), most households in the neighbourhood is split between one person households (52%) and two person households (32%).

Surrounding neighbourhoods

References

External links 
 Mill Woods Town Centre Neighbourhood Profile

Neighbourhoods in Edmonton